The Mid Derbyshire by-election was a Parliamentary by-election held on 15 July 1909. The constituency returned one Member of Parliament (MP) to the House of Commons of the United Kingdom, elected by the first past the post voting system.

Vacancy
The by-election was caused by the death of Sir James Jacoby on 23 June 1909. He had been Liberal MP for Mid Derbyshire since the 1885 general election.

Electoral history
The Liberals easily held the seat at the last election, with an increased majority;

Candidates
The local Liberal Association selected 51-year-old John Hancock to defend the seat. Hancock was a miners agent for the Nottingham Miners Association and was sponsored by the Liberal Party supporting Derbyshire Miners Association. This was a significant selection as miners accounted for about two thirds of the electorate. The Labour Party were happy to give Hancock their support.
The Conservatives re-selected Samuel Cresswell as their candidate.

Campaign
Polling Day was fixed for the 15 July 1909, just 22 days after the death of the previous MP.
Hancock closely associated himself with Lloyd George's People's Budget.
During the campaign Hancock agreed that if elected, he would sign the Labour Party constitution.
The Conservative campaign centred on the Navy and Tariff Reform.

Result
Hancock held the seat with a slightly reduced majority;

Aftermath
Hancock held the seat at the following General election under his new party label. However, along with many other miners MPs, he fell out with the Labour Party and crossed the floor back to the Liberal Party in 1915.

References

 Craig, F. W. S. (1974). British parliamentary election results 1885-1918 (1 ed.). London: Macmillan.
 Wikipedia: en.wikipedia.org
 Who's Who: www.ukwhoswho.com
 Debrett's House of Commons 1916

Mid Derbyshire by-election
Mid Derbyshire by-election
1900s in Derbyshire
By-elections to the Parliament of the United Kingdom in Derbyshire constituencies